The 1921 U.S. National Championships (now known as the US Open) was a tennis tournament that took place on the outdoor grass courts at the Germantown Cricket Club in Philadelphia, United States. The women's tournament was held from 15 August until 20 August while the men's tournament ran from 9 September until 19 September. It was the 41st staging of the U.S. National Championships and the second Grand Slam tennis event of the year. Although Mallory won the women's singles event for the sixth time in seven years, her victory was overshadowed by her second-round win over Suzanne Lenglen, who was making her only ever competitive appearance in the United States. Lenglen retired from the match after losing the first set, the only competitive loss after World War I of her career.

Finals

Men's singles

 Bill Tilden defeated  Wallace F. Johnson  6–1, 6–3, 6–1

Women's singles

 Molla Bjurstedt Mallory defeated  Mary Browne  4–6, 6–4, 6–2

Men's doubles
 Bill Tilden /  Vincent Richards defeated  Richard Norris Williams /  Watson Washburn 13–11, 12–10, 6–1

Women's doubles
 Mary Browne /  Louise Riddell Williams defeated  Helen Gilleaudeau /  Aletta Bailey Morris 6–3, 6–2

Mixed doubles
 Mary Browne /  Bill Johnston defeated  Molla Bjurstedt Mallory /  Bill Tilden 3–6, 6–4, 6–3

References

External links
Official US Open website

 
U.S. National Championships
U.S. National Championships (tennis) by year
U.S. National Championships (tennis)
U.S. National Championships
U.S. National Championships
U.S. National Championships
Sports competitions in Philadelphia